The Franklin Medal was a science award presented from 1915 until 1997 by the Franklin Institute located in Philadelphia, Pennsylvania, U.S. It was founded in 1914 by Samuel Insull.

The Franklin Medal was the most prestigious of the various awards presented by the Franklin Institute. Together with other historical awards, it was merged into the Benjamin Franklin Medal, initiated in 1998.

Laureates
Recipients are listed in a database on The Franklin Institute website.

References

External links
 The Franklin Institute Awards

Franklin Institute awards